Cleomedes is a prominent lunar impact crater located in the northeast part of the visible Moon, to the north of Mare Crisium. It was named after Greek astronomer Cleomedes. It is surrounded by rough ground with multiple crater impacts. The irregular crater Tralles intrudes into the northwest rim. To the east is Delmotte. North of Cleomedes is a triple-crater formation with Burckhardt occupying the center.

The outer wall of Cleomedes is heavily worn and eroded, especially along the southern part of the wall. Cleomedes C lies across the south-southwest rim. The crater floor is nearly flat, with a small central peak to the north of the midpoint, forming a linear ridge toward the north-northeast. There are several notable craterlets on the floor, including a pair of overlapping craters just inside the northwest rim.

A rille named Rima Cleomedes crosses the northern floor, running southeast from the northwest rim. This rille branches in a fork after crossing the crater mid-line. Smaller clefts lie in the southeast part of the floor.

Satellite craters
By convention these features are identified on lunar maps by placing the letter on the side of the crater midpoint that is closest to Cleomedes.

References

External links
 High resolution lunar overflight video by Seán Doran, based on LRO data, that passes over Mare Crisium and ends over Cleomedes (see album for more)

Impact craters on the Moon